Grace Spaulding John, (1890 – 1972),  American painter, author and lecturer born in Battle Creek, Michigan.  Her early years were spent in Vermont, and around the age of thirteen she moved with her family to Texas.

She studied at the St. Louis School of Fine Arts, at the National Academy of Design, the School of the Art Institute of Chicago, at Pennsylvania Academy of Fine Arts and at the Art Students League, variously with Charles Webster Hawthorne, Daniel Garber, Fred Weber and with Emil Bisttram in Taos.

“A fine portrait painter, she executed over a hundred and twenty-five portraits, all done from life, among them Thomas Mann, Edgar Lee Masters, and Oveta Culp Hobby dressed in her uniform as first commander of the Women's Army Auxiliary Corps which is now in the National Portrait Gallery in Washington, D.C.  During her career, she had twenty-seven one-man shows.”

John is the author of the books “Memo: Verses with Drawings by the Author”,  “The Living Line: Drawings and Verses.” (1962), “The Knotless Thread” (1970), “One-Plus One_Plus One (1972) and is the illustrator of “Azalea Commemorating Its Twentieth Annual Azalea Trail Houston” (1955).

Grace Spaulding John's papers can be found at the Woodson Research Center, Fondren Library, Rice University.

References

1890 births
1972 deaths
Fellows of the American Academy of Arts and Sciences
National Academy of Design alumni
Pennsylvania Academy of the Fine Arts alumni
20th-century American painters
American women painters
Art Students League of New York alumni
Painters from New Mexico
Painters from Texas
20th-century American women artists
School of the Art Institute of Chicago alumni
American portrait painters
People from Battle Creek, Michigan
Painters from Michigan